John Berry (25 September 1866 – 10 May 1930), also known by the nickname of 'Buff', was an English rugby union, and professional rugby league footballer who played in the 1880s and 1890s. Prior to Tuesday 27 August 1895, Tyldesley was a rugby union club.

Background
John Berry was born in Kendal, Westmorland, and he died aged 63 in Manchester, Lancashire, England.

Playing career

International honours
John Berry won caps for England (RU) while at Tyldesley in 1891 against Wales, Ireland, and Scotland.

Rugby union county cup Final appearances
During John Berry's time at Tyldesley, they beat Widnes to win the 1895 Lancashire Cup (RU) at Wilderspool Stadium, Warrington in front of 15,000 spectators.

Change of Code
When Tyldesley converted from the rugby union code to the rugby league code on Thursday 29 August 1895, John Berry was 28 years of age. Consequently, he was both a rugby union, and rugby league footballer for Tyldesley.

Genealogical Information
John Berry was the older brother of the rugby union, and rugby league footballer for Kendal Hornets, and Tyldesley; William Berry.

References

External links
(archived by web.archive.org) (Kendal Hornets) History
(archived by web.archive.org) (Tyldesley RUFC) Club History

1866 births
1930 deaths
England international rugby union players
English rugby league players
English rugby union players
Lancashire rugby league team players
Rugby league five-eighths
Rugby league players from Kendal
Rugby union fly-halves
Rugby union players from Kendal
Tyldesley FC players